George Frederick Cameron (24 September 1854 – 17 September 1885) was a Canadian poet, lawyer, and journalist, best known for the libretto for the operetta Leo, the Royal Cadet.

Life

He was born in New Glasgow, Nova Scotia, the son of James Grant Cameron and Jessie Sutherland. He was educated in New Glasgow.

He moved to Boston in April 1869. For three years he was writing on the subject of freedom, especially the struggle which was taking place in Cuba. He graduated from the Boston University School of Law in 1877. He worked for the law firm Dean, Butler and Abbot of Boston from 1877 to 1882. He contributed poetry to Boston periodicals, including the Courier and the Transcript. In fall 1882 he enrolled in Queen's College in Kingston, Ontario where he won a poetry prize in 1883 for "Adelphi." He is sometimes considered one of the Confederation Poets.

He married a 12-year Ella Amey on 22 August 1883. He was the editor of the Daily News in Kingston, Ontario from March 1883 until his death of heart failure on 17 September 1885 at Millhaven, Ontario. The couple had had one daughter, Jessie Cameron Alison.

George Frederick Cameron was a war poet since he was a poet writing in time of and on the subject of the Anglo-Zulu War. He wrote Leo, the Royal Cadet. The latter achieved over 1,700 performances between its premiere in 1889 and 1925 and has recently been revived in 2001 and 2010. In 1887 his brother, Charles L. Cameron, edited and published a selection of Cameron's poems under the title Lyrics on Freedom, Love and Death (Kingston, 1887).

Recognition
Cameron's poem "On Leaving the Coast of Nova Scotia" was included in the 1889 anthology Songs of the Great Dominion. His poetry also appeared in A Century of Canadian Sonnets (1910).

George Frederick Cameron was declared a Person of National Historic Significance in 1946. A bronze plaque was affixed to the New Glasgow post office (since moved to the town's Dominion Building) by Historic Sites and Monuments of Canada which reads: "George Frederick Cameron, Poet and Journalist, Author of "Lyrics of Freedom, Love and Death". Born at New Glasgow, 24 September 1854. Died in Kingston, Ontario, 17 September 1885."

Works

 "Leo, the Royal Cadet", George Frederick Cameron (Libretto) and Oscar Ferdinand Telgmann, 'An entirely new and original military opera in four acts' (Kingston, 1889)
 "Ho! Ho! My Airy Fairy Maid," "Ho! Ho! My Pretty Maid," "I met him in the far away" from Opera and Operetta Excerpts Composer: Oscar Ferdinand Telgmann
 Words: George Frederick Cameron Farewell, O Fragrant Pumpkin Pie from  Leo, the Royal Cadet Composer: Oscar Ferdinand Telgmann
 Our Premier music/words by George Frederick Cameron; music by Oscar Telgmann Kingston, Ont.: C.J. Cameron, c 1885 in honour of John A. Macdonald
  –  – 
 
 
 
  –

Fonds
The George F. Cameron fonds at the University of British Columbia consists of manuscript notebooks as well as handwritten and typewritten copies of his poetry.

References

See also

 List of Canadian poets
 Persons of National Historic Significance (Canada)

1854 births
1885 deaths
19th-century Canadian poets
Canadian male poets
Boston University School of Law alumni
Opera librettists
Sonneteers
People from New Glasgow, Nova Scotia
Writers from Nova Scotia
19th-century Canadian dramatists and playwrights
19th-century Canadian male writers
Canadian male dramatists and playwrights